The Tribune is a daily broadsheet newspaper and news website that covers San Luis Obispo County, California.

It was created in 1939 from a combination of three newspapers founded between 1869 and 1905, and was later acquired by the E. W. Scripps Company. 

Walter Murray led the establishment of The Tribune in the late 1860s, starting as the publication's editor and co-owner, with the first issue being printed on August 7, 1869. By 1886, the newspaper was produced above the Chicago Brewery Depot housed at the corner of Chorro and Monterey streets. In April 1939, it merged with the Telegram, an anti-saloon newspaper in town, becoming the Telegram-Tribune. The publication later moved from 1240 Morro Street to 1321 Johnson Avenue beginning in 1958, operating there for the next 35 years, before relocating once more to a new building, at 3825 S. Higuera Street, in 1993.

Scripps traded the paper, along with The Monterey County Herald, to Knight Ridder in 1997, in exchange for the Boulder Daily Camera. The McClatchy Company took over the paper on June 27, 2006, when it acquired Knight Ridder, formerly the United States' second-largest chain of daily newspapers.

The Tribune owns one weekly newspaper, The Cambrian, located in Cambria, California. A second weekly newspaper, The Sun Bulletin of Morro Bay, no longer publishes. According to McClatchy, the newspaper's daily circulation is 35,080 as of 2015.

In February 2015, the paper's publisher, Bruce Ray, announced his resignation; Fresno Bee president and publisher Tom Cullinan was named publisher for the paper. In late 2015, along with many other McClatchy newspapers, The Tribune went through a redesign, adopting a companywide design style for both print and online platforms. Ken Riddick was named president and publisher of The Tribune in October 2017. The Tribune's longtime executive editor Sandra Duerr retired in December 2017.

On February 13, 2020, the paper announced that its owner, The McClatchy Company, had declared bankruptcy. In an article by Kevin G. Hall, McClatchy claimed that bankruptcy was necessary in order to "... shed costs of print legacy and speed shift to digital." Court filings revealed a plan that would turn over control to hedge fund management company, Chatham Asset Management. The family-held company would have to give up its shares in McClatchy, which according to a press release, operates 31 newspapers from Miami to Sacramento, California. No information was given about potential layoffs at that time.

References

External links

 
 The McClatchy Company's subsidiary profile of The Tribune

Daily newspapers published in California
Mass media in San Luis Obispo County, California
San Luis Obispo, California
McClatchy publications